The Newkirk Viaduct Monument (also, Newkirk Monument) is a 15-foot white marble obelisk in the West Philadelphia neighborhood of Philadelphia, Pennsylvania. Installed in 1839, it is inscribed with the names of 51 railroad builders and executives, among other information.

Designed by Thomas Ustick Walter, a future Architect of the Capitol, the monument was erected by the Philadelphia, Wilmington and Baltimore Railroad to mark its completion of a bridge across the Schuylkill River and the first railroad line south from Philadelphia. The monument, which originally sat about 700 feet from the riverbank, was moved sometime after 1927 about 600 feet further inland, where it sat for decades by the main line that became Amtrak's Northeast Corridor. In 2016, it was moved to its present location, about 100 feet from the river's edge at the north end of the Bartram's Mile section of the Schuylkill River Trail.

History 
The monument commemorates the 1838 completion of the Newkirk Viaduct, also called the Gray's Ferry Bridge, over the Schuylkill River. The bridge completed the first direct rail line between Philadelphia and Baltimore, Maryland — tracks that closely paralleled the King's Highway, the main land route to the southern states.

On August 14, 1838, the PW&B board of directors decided to name the bridge after company president Matthew Newkirk (1794-1868), a Philadelphia business and civic leader, and to commission a monument at its west end. (Earlier in the year, the company gave Newkirk a silver plate worth $1,000 ($ today) to reward him for arranging the merger of four railroads that together built the Philadelphia-Baltimore line.)

Designed by Thomas Ustick Walter, who would go on to design the dome of the U.S. Capitol, the white marble monument consists of seven pieces of carved stone held together simply by weight and friction — not reinforced, for example, with metal pins. The uppermost piece, a 7-foot obelisk, weighs about 6,000 pounds, while the 5-foot base and other pieces weigh a rough total of 12,000 pounds. The obelisk and base are inscribed with the names of 51 men, including senior officials of the four railroads and various employees who helped build the bridge and rail line.

The monument was installed along the western approach to the bridge and surrounded by a low iron fence. An 1895 account describes its location as "on a high bank in the angle formed by the junction of the Philadelphia, Wilmington and Baltimore Railroad and the Chester Branch of the Philadelphia and Reading Railway just below the western end of the Gray's Ferry Bridge." It sat about 700 feet from the Schuylkill River, at 39.93975 north latitude, 75.20830 west longitude.

In 1872, the PW&B built a new mainline west of the Viaduct. It leased its old line to the Philadelphia and Reading Railway, which built a small railyard, surrounding the monument. 

After a half-century, the monument had fallen into obscurity, except perhaps to vandals. "Surrounding the structure is an iron fence to protect it from vandalism, but it has, nevertheless, been a frequent target for irresponsible hoodlums," the Philadelphia Inquirer wrote in 1896. In 1900, the Philadelphia Record wrote of the monument: "On account of its inaccessibility and the dense foliage, it is scarcely ever seen."

Ca. 1930 move 
By January 1926, the Pennsylvania Railroad was making plans to move the monument "because of the additional yard facilities which are required at that point. The understanding is that it will be placed on the present site of the Gray's Ferry Station. The engineering department of the Pennsylvania Railroad has the matter in charge."  

A May 1927 aerial photo shows it still in its original location. But presently, it was moved to the site of the now-demolished station, along the 1872 mainline, just northeast of the 49th Street Bridge, at 39.939492 north latitude, 75.210633 west longitude. It seems to have been moved by September 1930, when a reader asked the Inquirer about "a monument beside the Pennsylvania Railroad near the first overhead crossing which is located about Forty-Eighth or Fiftieth Street". (In 1939, a retired Pennsylvania Railroad employee—perhaps having forgotten the actual year of the move—told the Delaware County Daily Times that the monument had been moved in late 1917 to make way for the "Hog Island Railroad"—formally, the 60th Street Branch of the Pennsylvania Railroad—and that three of Newkirk's daughters had been asked their permission for the move.)

For the next eight decades, the monument sat all but abandoned, in disrepair, and nearly forgotten, though it was visible to passengers traveling Amtrak's Northeast Corridor or SEPTA Regional Rail trains on the Airport Line and the Wilmington/Newark Line.

2016 move 
In 2013, interest in the Newkirk Monument was rekindled by a pair of articles written by Bradley Peniston for Hidden City Philadelphia, a local organization about the built environment. The articles explored the monument's significance and suggested it be moved to a more visible site. Over the next few years, the idea was embraced and brought to fruition by a host of public and private entities, including Amtrak, Philadelphia Parks & Recreation, Schuylkill River Development Corporation, landscape architects Andropogon Associates, planners PennPraxis, conservators Materials Conservation, and movers with the George Young Company. On November 17–18, 2016, the monument was moved to a new concrete pad along the under-construction "Bartram's Mile" section of the Schuylkill River Trail.

Inscription
As transcribed by Wilson, the four sides of the monument and its base are inscribed as follows:

Wilson's transcription contains several errors; for example, it misspells the last names of Henry Hazlehurst, Edward Tatnall, and Charles and Alexander Provest.

References

External links
"Newkirk Monument," Schuylkill Banks Development Corporation, May 5, 2017.
 Photos of the 2016 move, via  Flickr.

Peniston, Bradley (August 26, 2015). Video: "Where Did the Newkirk Monument Originally Stand?"

Obelisks in the United States
Pennsylvania Railroad
Landmarks in Philadelphia
Monuments and memorials in Philadelphia
Marble sculptures in Pennsylvania
Vandalized works of art in Pennsylvania
1839 sculptures
1839 establishments in Pennsylvania
Philadelphia, Wilmington and Baltimore Railroad
Relocated buildings and structures in Pennsylvania